Nadine Visser (born 9 February 1995) is a Dutch athlete. She originally specialised in the heptathlon, but eventually switched to short hurdling. Visser won the bronze medal in the 60 metres hurdles at the 2018 World Indoor Championships. She claimed gold medals in the event at the 2019 and 2021 European Indoor Championships, and silver at the 2023 edition. She earned bronze and gold in the 100 metres hurdles at the 2015 and 2017 European Under-23 Championships respectively.

Visser was the 2014 World Junior Championships bronze medallist for the heptathlon and 100 m hurdles. She also won gold in the 100m hurdles at the 2017 Universiade. She represented Netherlands at both the 2016 Rio and 2020 Tokyo Olympics. Visser is the Dutch record holder for the 100 m hurdles and Dutch indoor record holder for the 60 m hurdles. She is a multiple national champion. She is coached by Bart Bennema, who is also the coach of Dafne Schippers.

Career
Visser's first sports were gymnastics and football; she took up athletics at age 13. She represented the Netherlands at the 2011 European Youth Olympic Festival in Trabzon, winning gold in both the 100 m hurdles and the 4 × 100 metres relay. Visser competed as a heptathlete at the 2012 World Junior Championships in Barcelona, placing eleventh with 5447 points. In 2013, she placed fourth in the heptathlon at the European Junior Championships in Rieti, scoring 5774 points; in the heptathlon's opening event, the 100 m hurdles, she ran 13.21 (+1.5) to break Dafne Schippers's Dutch junior record from 2011.

Outdoors, Visser competed in the Götzis Hypo-Meeting for the first time, scoring a personal best 6110 points and placing 14th. At the 2014 World Junior Championships in Eugene, Oregon she took part in both the heptathlon and the 100 m hurdles, winning bronze medals in both events; in the hurdles she broke 13 seconds for the first time, her time of 12.99 (+1.9) setting a new Dutch junior and under-23 record. Visser qualified for her first senior European Championships that summer, representing the Netherlands in the 100 m hurdles; she ran 13.12 (-2.0) in the heats and was narrowly eliminated from the semi-finals.

2015
In 2015 Visser became Dutch senior champion for the first time, winning the 60 m hurdles in 8.12 at the national indoor championships in Apeldoorn; she was selected for the European Indoor Championships in Prague, despite not quite meeting the national federation's qualification standard. In Prague she qualified from the heats on time, but fell in her semi-final and was eliminated. Outdoors, Visser improved her national under-23 hurdles record to 12.97 (+1.4) at the FBK Games in Hengelo on May 24; the following week, she placed 5th in the Hypo-Meeting with a personal best 6467 points. Before the 2015 European U23 Championships in Tallinn Visser had reached the qualifying standard in five events (100 m, 200 m, 100 m hurdles, long jump and heptathlon); she chose to compete in the hurdles and the long jump, winning a bronze in the hurdles with a time of 13.01 (-0.2).

At the 2015 European U23 Championships Visser won a bronze in the 100 m hurdles. She went on to compete at the 2015 World Championships in Athletics in Beijing (China), finishing 8th at the heptathlon. She was also the start runner of the Dutch 4x100 meters relay team with Dafne Schippers, Naomi Sedney and Jamile Samuel that finished 5th in 42.32 in the final, but was disqualified for a changeover infringement. In the heats the team had also run 42.32, a new national record. At the end of the summer season she finished 3d at the Décastar heptathlon in Talence (France).

At the 2016 European Athletics Championships 100 m hurdles in Amsterdam, she was eliminated in the semifinals. At the Athletics at the 2016 Summer Olympics heptathlon in Rio de Janeiro (Brazil), she finished at a disappointing 19th place.

Heptathlon or high hurdles
At the 2017 European U23 Championships she won a gold at the 100 m hurdles. "It was going well until the eighth hurdle and then it became kind of messy," said Visser. "But I am happy to finish first." She took a 2nd place at the Mehrkampf-Meeting in Ratingen (Germany), behind Carolin Schäfer. In August 2017, Visser finished seventh with 6370 points at the World Championships in London (UK). She won a gold at the 100 m hurdles at the 2017 Summer Universiade for university athletes.

The 2018 season started with a bronze at the World Indoor Championships 60m hurdles. She had clocked 7.83 to win her semi-final, obliterating Marjan Olyslager’s Dutch record of 7.89 which had stood since 1989. In consultation with her coach Bart Bennema, Visser had to make a decision about her future: the heptathlon or high hurdles. With the 2018 European championships in Berlin on the doorstep and given her chances of victory on the hurdles at that event, she decided to concentrate on hurdling. In June 2018, at the Diamond League in Stockholm she ran a new national record on the 100 m hurdles in 12.71, breaking the almost 30-year old record of Olyslager from 1989. She finished fourth at the 2018 European Athletics Championships in 12.88.

In 2019, she started with winning the 60 m hurdles' title at the 2019 European Athletics Indoor Championships. At the 2019 World Athletics Championships in Doha she finished sixth in the 100 m hurdles final. She had broken her own national record in the semi-finals, clocking 12.62 (+1.0m/s).

Achievements

Personal bests
 60 m hurdles – 7.77 (Toruń 2021) 
 60 metres indoor – 7.22 (Apeldoorn 2023)
 Pentathlon – 4428 pts (Apeldoorn 2017)
 100 m hurdles – 12.51 (+0.4 m/s, Zürich 2021) 
 100 metres – 11.25 (+1.2 m/s, Utrecht 2020)
 Heptathlon – 6467 pts (Götzis 2015)

International competitions

1Did not finish in the final

National titles
 Dutch Athletics Championships
 100 metres: 2020
 100 m hurdles: 2015, 2020, 2022
 Dutch Indoor Athletics Championships
 60 m hurdles: 2015, 2016, 2017, 2018, 2019, 2020, 2021
 Pentathlon: 2017

References

External links
 
 

1995 births
Living people
Dutch female hurdlers
Dutch heptathletes
People from Hoogkarspel
World Athletics Championships athletes for the Netherlands
Athletes (track and field) at the 2016 Summer Olympics
Olympic athletes of the Netherlands
Universiade medalists in athletics (track and field)
Universiade gold medalists for the Netherlands
Medalists at the 2017 Summer Universiade
European Athletics Indoor Championships winners
Athletes (track and field) at the 2020 Summer Olympics
Sportspeople from North Holland
21st-century Dutch women